Harry Cole (born 27 April 1986) is a British journalist who has been the political editor of The Sun since 2020, having previously been the deputy political editor of The Mail On Sunday.

Early life and education
Cole was born on 27 April 1986. His early education was at Sevenoaks School and Tonbridge School (both private schools in Kent). Cole studied Anthropology and Economic History at the University of Edinburgh, graduating with an MA in 2009. While at university, he was Vice-Chairman and Treasurer of the Edinburgh University Conservative Association. and was Vice-President of Scottish Conservative Future. He also wrote the Tory Bear blog which focussed on right-wing politics.

He ran to become Edinburgh University Students' Association President in 2008. Cole withdrew his candidacy after the student newspaper The Journal reported that his campaign was behind the anonymous blog EUSAless which had criticised the union and other candidates including an attack on another candidate's sexual orientation. He had previously denied involvement when asked and had urged other candidates to sign a clean campaign pledge.

Career
Paul Staines hired Cole initially as an intern for his right-wing website Guido Fawkes due to his involvement in EUSAless. His first major story was coverage of the United Kingdom parliamentary expenses scandal in 2009. Cole reported that Guido Fawkes made most of its money through selling stories to newspapers but this revenue stream dwindled after the Leveson Inquiry so he later became a diarist in the tabloid newspapers The Daily Star Sunday in 2012 and The Sun on Sunday in 2013. During his time at Guido Fawkes, he was also a contributing editor for The Spectator. He left Guido Fawkes in 2015 to become the Westminster Correspondent for The Sun. Cole then moved to The Mail on Sunday in 2018 as deputy political editor before returning to The Sun and replacing Tom Newton Dunn as its political editor in 2020.

Cole's stories include the then Health Secretary Matt Hancock's extramarital affair with his aide Gina Coladangelo and their breaking of COVID-19 social distancing restrictions in 2021 which won Scoop of the Year at the British Journalism Awards. In September 2022, it was announced that Cole and fellow journalist James Heale would be writing a book about the British Conservative Party politician Liz Truss who had recently become prime minister after winning the July–September 2022 Conservative Party leadership election called Out of the Blue. It was published in November 2022. Out of the Blue was named as The Sunday Times political book of the year.

References

External links

Living people
People educated at Sevenoaks School
People educated at Tonbridge School
Alumni of the University of Edinburgh
English bloggers
English political journalists
The Sun (United Kingdom) people
Daily Mail journalists
1986 births
British male bloggers